Philip Ramond Regan (born April 6, 1937) is an American former professional baseball pitcher, scout, and manager, who played in Major League Baseball (MLB) for the Detroit Tigers, Los Angeles Dodgers, Chicago Cubs, and Chicago White Sox; he also managed the Baltimore Orioles. Regan served as the pitching coach for the New York Mets for part of the 2019 season.

During the 1966 season, when Regan was Walter Alston's favorite pitcher from the Dodger bullpen, teammate Sandy Koufax nicknamed Regan "The Vulture", due to his knack for earning wins in late-inning relief situations.

Early years
Regan earned varsity letters in basketball, football, and baseball at Wayland High School in Wayland, Michigan. After one year at Western Michigan University, he signed with the Detroit Tigers in 1956. He compiled a 61-42 record and 3.76 earned run average as a starting pitcher in the Tigers' farm system before earning a call up to the majors midway through the 1960 season.

Playing career

Detroit Tigers
He made his major league debut on July 19 against the Washington Senators. Entering the game already behind 3-0, he allowed just two hits in five innings of work, including a home run to Harmon Killebrew.

He made his first career start in the second game of a doubleheader with the Baltimore Orioles on July 23. He left the game with two outs in the ninth inning with the score tied at three, and the bases loaded. Relief pitcher Clem Labine walked Jim Gentile to drive in the winning run, and hand Regan his first career loss. Splitting his time between starts and relief appearances, he was 0-4 with a 4.50 ERA his rookie season. His first career win also came against Baltimore during his second season in the big leagues, when he went 10-7 with a 5.25 ERA.

Over six seasons, Regan went 42-44 with a 4.50 ERA for the Detroit Tigers. He was 0-4 with a 4.99 ERA in 1965 when he was demoted to triple A Syracuse. He earned a call up that September, and made two appearances, but it was while he was with Syracuse that Regan learned of interest in him from the Dodgers organization.

Los Angeles Dodgers
Regan called Tigers General Manager Jim Campbell asking to be traded, and on December 15, 1965, he was traded to the Los Angeles Dodgers for infielder Dick Tracewski.

With Sandy Koufax, Don Drysdale, Claude Osteen, and Don Sutton in the starting rotation, Regan was used strictly as a reliever in 1966. He responded by going 14-1 with a 1.62 ERA, 88 strikeouts in 116 innings pitched and a National League leading 21 saves to help the Dodgers capture the NL pennant by a game and a half over the San Francisco Giants.  It was on August 1 of that year, by Regan's own account, that he first acquired the "Vulture" moniker from Koufax, the latter having just exited his second consecutive game, tied 1-1, only to see Regan "swoop in" for the last-minute win.

The Sporting News named him the NL Reliever of the Year and NL Comeback Player of the Year in 1966. He also earned the only All-Star nod in his career, but did not appear in the game. He appeared in two games of the  World Series, allowing just one base runner via a walk, and retiring the other five he faced.

Regan won his first two decisions in 1967 to give him 15 consecutive wins before finally losing to the Houston Astros on May 15. He won both games of a doubleheader with the New York Mets on April 21, 1968. Two days later, he was traded with Jim Hickman to the Chicago Cubs for Jim Ellis and Ted Savage.

Chicago Cubs

Regan provided similar heroics for his new team. In his first two appearances as a Cub, he saved both games of an April 28 doubleheader with the Houston Astros. Despite missing the first 14 games of the Cubs' schedule, Regan led all of Major League Baseball with 25 saves in 1968 on his way to capturing a second Sporting News Reliever of the Year Award.

He was involved in a bizarre incident on August 18, 1968, against the Cincinnati Reds. Regan apparently had good stuff that day, too good for home plate umpire Chris Pelekoudas. Despite no illegal substances being found on the ball, Pelekoudas called 14 illegal pitches on Regan based simply on the movement of the ball. Regan met with NL President Warren Giles August 20, and was absolved of any wrongdoing. The incident earned Regan a reputation that followed him the rest of his career.

Retirement
During the twilight of his career, Regan found his workload diminishing rapidly. Through May 1972, Regan had pitched just four innings for the Cubs. He asked to be traded or released, and on June 2, Regan's contract was sold to the crosstown Chicago White Sox. He appeared in ten games for the Chisox, going 0-1 with a 4.05 ERA before his release on July 20.

Career stats

The only shutout of Regan's career came on May 10, 1963 against the Cleveland Indians. He also hit his only career home run in the 14-0 drubbing of the Tribe.

Coaching career
Immediately upon retirement, Regan went into coaching. He accepted his first coaching job at Grand Valley State University in his home state of Michigan simply because it was close to home. He was head coach from 1973 to 1982, winning the Great Lakes Conference title and the NAIA District 23 Championship twice each.

Regan’s work at Grand Valley earned him a call from Seattle Mariners general manager Dan O'Brien Sr. After spending the 1983 season as the Mariners' minor league pitching instructor and advance scout, Regan was promoted to major league pitching coach in 1984. His tenure in Seattle was interrupted by a two-game suspension in 1985 when he bumped umpire Derryl Cousins during a bench clearing brawl between the M's and California Angels on August 12.

Regan resigned from his position with the Mariners following the 1986 season. In 1987, he began a six-year stint with the Dodgers as their major league special assignment and advance scout. Regan was up for the Florida Marlins managerial job, late in 1992, but withdrew his name from consideration. A year later, he joined the Cleveland Indians as pitching coach during the strike-shortened 1994 season.

In 1995, Regan received his only major league managerial position, managing the Baltimore Orioles to a 71-73 record. Due to the 1994–95 Major League Baseball strike carrying into the 1995 season, the league played a shortened 144-game schedule that commenced on April 25. The Orioles missed the playoffs, ultimately finishing third in the American League East. After just one season at the helm, Regan was fired, and replaced by Davey Johnson.

The remainder of his professional coaching career is summarized below:
1987–1989 – Managed Leones del Escogido to Dominican Championship. Won the Caribbean World Series, in 1988.
1989–2009 – Managed teams in the Venezuelan Winter League, including Leones del Caracas, Navegantes del Magallanes, Cardenales de Lara, Bravos de Margarita, and Tiburones de La Guaira.
1996 – Managed Los Angeles Dodgers Triple-A affiliate Albuquerque Dukes (finished with a record of 67-76).
1997 – Served as Chicago Cubs pitching coach (1997–1998).
1999 – Served as Cleveland Indians pitching coach.
2000 – Served as Team USA pitching coach at Summer Olympics in Sydney.
2002 – Served as West Michigan Whitecaps manager (2002–2003).
2009–2015 – St. Lucie Mets pitching coach.
2016–2019 – New York Mets minor league assistant pitching coordinator.
2019 – Promoted to New York Mets interim pitching coach on June 20 after Dave Eiland was fired. Retired following the season.
2019–2020 – Toros del Este pitching coach (won Dominican Championship).

Managerial record

See also
The Sporting News Comeback Player of the Year Award
The Sporting News Reliever of the Year Award
List of Major League Baseball annual saves leaders

References

Further reading
 Associated Press. "The Vulture Thrives on Country Sinker". The San Bernardino Sun. September 14, 1966.
 United Press International. "Regan Has Strange World Series Ambition". The San Bernardino Sun. October 5, 1966.
 Olderman, Murray (NEA). "Between You 'n' Me". The Columbia Missourian. March 29. 1967.
 Boswell, Thomas. "'The Vulture' As Boss Bird". The Washington Post. October 17, 1994. pp. C1, C4.
 Maske, Mark. "Rookie Reagan to Take Over As Manager; At Age 57, He Gets His 1st Chance". The Washington Post. October 17, 1994. pp. C1, C4.
 Blum, Ronald. "Regan fulfills goal to pitch batting practice at age 80". AP News. April 17, 2017.

External links

Phil Regan at SABR (Baseball BioProject)

1937 births
Living people
Baseball players from Michigan
Caribbean Series managers
Major League Baseball pitchers
Detroit Tigers players
Los Angeles Dodgers players
Chicago Cubs players
Chicago White Sox players
National League All-Stars
Baltimore Orioles managers
Major League Baseball pitching coaches
Minor league baseball managers
Jamestown Falcons players
Durham Bulls players
Birmingham Barons players
Charleston Senators players
Denver Bears players
Syracuse Chiefs players
Cleveland Indians coaches
Chicago Cubs coaches
Seattle Mariners coaches
New York Mets coaches
Los Angeles Dodgers scouts
People from Otsego, Michigan
American expatriate baseball players in Nicaragua
American expatriate baseball people in the Dominican Republic
American expatriate baseball people in Venezuela